Students Offering Support (SOS) is a multi-national charitable and entrepreneurial initiative that currently supports and develops individual SOS chapters within post-secondary institutions across North America. This organization's business model – uniquely designed "by students for students" – raises funds to build schools in Latin America through their Exam-AID review sessions, which are held prior to an exam and taught, as well as coordinated, by student volunteers.

Model
Students Offering Support (SOS) is a student-led charitable organization that currently supports and develops individual SOS chapters in post-secondary institutions across North America. The SOS model is “Raising Marks, Raising Money, Raising Roofs.” Each university SOS chapter's vision is to maximize charitable funds to raise roofs in rural communities within developing nations. The SOS mission is accomplished through raising grades during Exam-AID review sessions taught and coordinated by student volunteers for post-secondary students. With over 100 million children worldwide without access to education, Students Offering Support creates and implements sustainable education projects in developing nations with their annual outreach trips to Latin America.

Raising Marks.
Each university chapter of Students Offering Support conducts the Exam-AID program, which consists of 2-3 hour group review sessions held shortly before an exam. Exam-AID programs are taught by bright senior students who utilize SOS's unique teaching model to create an interactive learning environment. In addition to the review session, students are also provided with a take-home study guide to help them study for their approaching exams.

Raising Money.
The cost of an Exam-AID session is between $10 and $30, depending on the length and coverage of the session. Since its inception, Students Offering Support has tutored over 25,000 students in North America and raised over $700,000 for outreach initiatives in developing nations. For the 2011–2012 school year, the 26+ SOS chapters are working together to raise $350,000 for various sustainable education projects that will be implemented through their annual outreach trips to Latin America.

Raising Roofs.
All of SOS's projects are not only funded, but also personally built, by SOS volunteers during annual outreach trips. Student volunteers travel to a community in Latin America at their own expense, spending approximately two weeks building their designated project. SOS volunteers work very closely with a local NGO within each community to ensure that the projects and trips are properly organized, and even conduct follow-ups with the target communities in the aftermath of completing a project.

History

2004 – 2005: BUCS Association and the birth of Exam-AID

In September 2004, the founder of Students Offering Support, Greg Overholt, formed the BUCS Association (Business and Computing Students) at Wilfrid Laurier University to assist students in the double-degree program. The birth of the Exam-AID program as an effective charitable initiative followed shortly after the success of the BUCS Association. In the first year, SOS volunteers offered two 1st year Economics courses and tutored over 200 students, raising a total of $5,500 worth of donations for charity.

2005 - 2006: Explosive Growth of Exam-AIDs

In 2005, SOS offered three more 1st-year courses in business and calculus. With over 25 volunteer tutors and 100 members of the BUCS association, SOS tutored over 600 students and raised over $31,000 for Free the Children. Through Free the Children, SOS's charitable donation went towards providing accessible education to Kenyan children. This caught the attention of the Waterloo Record, which wrote the first article on the Exam-AID program.

2006 - 2007: Birth of Students Offering Support Charity

SOS: Students Offering Support was born in 2006 when the Exam-AID initiative grew too large for the BUCS Association. By offering both 1st and 2nd-year courses, along with a more formal structure and accessible online registration system, SOS aided over 1,110 first and second-year students, raising $65,000 in charitable donations. These results attracted Waterloo Record once again, and another article was written on the Exam-AID program.

In 2007, SOS volunteers funded an educational development project and helped build it on the first annual volunteer outreach trip to San Ignacio, Belize. With the help of a local NGO, Proworld, Laurier's team traveled to the small village of Calla Creek and upgraded their run-down elementary school.

2007 - 2008: The National Association is born

Trent University, Student's Offering Support's second post-secondary chapter, found success, raising over $8,700 and confirming the SOS model strength to other universities. As a result, the National Association was created and, after its success in four national business plan competitions, generated over $15,000 in funding for national expansion. Trent and Laurier continued to work with the NGO Friend of Honduran Children and ran trips to provide infrastructural support to the Flor Azul orphan farm school.

2008 - 2009: Students Offering Support expands to Chapters in 11 Universities

SOS launched chapters in Ontario and Quebec universities, as well as the pilot of a high school SOS chapter in the Waterloo Region. From the 300+ student volunteers that worked through the chapters listed below, they raised over $100,000 for four projects in Costa Rica, Peru, El Salvador, and Honduras.

Below is a list of active chapters for 2008 – 2009:

  Wilfrid Laurier University
  Waterloo University
  York University
  Queen's University
  McGill University
  McMaster University
  Nipissing University
  Trent University
  University of Western Ontario
  University of Windsor
 University of Regina
 Victoria University
 HS SOS Waterloo – pilot project

2009 - 2010: SOS continues to grow

SOS expanded to four more university chapters and, with over 450 volunteers, they raised $190,000 across the various university chapters and coordinated eight different outreach trips to Peru, Costa Rica, Nicaragua, Guatemala and Peru.

Below is a list of the new chapter sites for 2009-2010:

 Ryerson University (now Toronto Metropolitan University)
 University of Toronto (St. George Campus)
 Simon Fraser University
 Dalhousie University
 GTA High School SOS
 London Region High School SOS

2010 - 2011: SOS is nation-wide

The year 2010-2011 has seen four more Canadian university chapters implement the SOS model within their respective post-secondary institutions. With nearly all major Canadian universities now supporting this initiative, SOS worked towards involving universities and colleges across the United States.

Below is a list of the new chapter sites for 2010 – 2011:

 University of British Columbia
 University of Toronto (Scarborough Campus)
 University of Guelph
 University of Ottawa

2011 - 2012: SOS expands to the United States

SOS has expanded to eleven new institutions in Canada and the United States and hopes to continue implementing new chapters in North America to reach a goal of $400,000. Alongside the fast-growing expansion rate of individual SOS chapters across North America in 2011, SOS's Exam-AID has affected over 25,000 students within Canada and the United States, whereas the outreach projects have directly impacted 2920 students in Latin America.

Below is a list of the new chapter sites for 2011-2012:

Canadian Institutions:		        
 Brock University				
 Carleton University		
 University of Victoria		
 Vancouver Island University	
 University of Calgary		
 Concordia University

American Institutions:
 University of Albany
 Duke University
 Florida International University 
 Harvard University
 Massachusetts Institute of Technology

References

External links

 Students Offering Support website

Youth-led organizations
Organizations based in Ontario
Organizations established in 2004
Charities based in Canada
2004 establishments in Canada